Aeschynite-(Ce) (or Aschynite, Eschinite, Eschynite) is a rare earth mineral of cerium, calcium, iron, thorium, titanium, niobium, oxygen, and hydrogen with chemical formula .  Its name comes from the Greek word αισχύνη ("aeschyne") for "shame" because early chemists had difficulty with separations of titanium from zirconium.

The "-(Ce)" means it has more cerium than the yttrium variety aeschynite-(Y). Its Mohs scale rating is 5–6.

See also
 List of minerals

References

Lanthanide minerals
Orthorhombic minerals
Minerals in space group 62